José Ramón Gil Samaniego (February 6, 1899 – October 30, 1968), known professionally as Ramon Novarro, was a Mexican-American actor. He began his career in silent films in 1917 and eventually became a leading man and one of the top box office attractions of the 1920s and early 1930s. Novarro was promoted by MGM as a "Latin lover" and became known as a sex symbol after the death of Rudolph Valentino. He is recognized as the first Latin American actor to succeed in Hollywood.

Early life 

Novarro was born José Ramón Gil Samaniego on February 6, 1899, in Durango City, Durango, north-west Mexico, to Dr. Mariano N. Samaniego, and his wife, Leonor (Pérez Gavilán). The family moved to Los Angeles to escape the Mexican Revolution in 1913. Novarro's direct ancestors came from the Castilian town of Burgos, whence two brothers emigrated to the New World in the seventeenth century.

Allan Ellenberger, Novarro's biographer, writes:

The family estate was called the "Garden of Eden". Thirteen children were born there: Emilio; Guadalupe; Rosa; Ramón; Leonor; Mariano; Luz; Antonio; José; a stillborn child; Carmen; Ángel and Eduardo. At the time of the Mexican Revolution, the family moved from Durango to Mexico City and then returned to Durango. Three of Ramón's sisters, Guadalupe, Rosa, and Leonor, became nuns. He was a second cousin of the Mexican actresses Dolores del Río and Andrea Palma.

Career

Silent films 

Novarro began his film career in 1917, playing bit parts, supplementing his income by working as a singing waiter, a taxi dancer and as a dancer in revues choreographed by Ernest Belcher (father of Marge Champion) . His friends, actor and director Rex Ingram and his wife, actress Alice Terry, began to promote him as a rival to Rudolph Valentino, and Ingram suggested he change his name to "Novarro". From 1923, he began to play more prominent roles. His role in Scaramouche (1923) brought him his first major success.

Novarro achieved his greatest success in 1925, in Ben-Hur. His revealing costumes caused a sensation. He was elevated into the Hollywood elite. As did many stars, Novarro engaged Sylvia of Hollywood as a physical therapist (although in her tell-all book, Sylvia erroneously claimed that Novarro slept in a coffin). With Valentino's death in 1926, Novarro became the screen's leading Latin actor, though ranked lower than his MGM contemporary John Gilbert as a leading man. Novarro was popular as a swashbuckler in action roles, and considered one of the great romantic lead actors of his day. He appeared with Norma Shearer in The Student Prince in Old Heidelberg (1927) and with Joan Crawford in Across to Singapore (1928).

Talking films 

He made his first talking film, starring as a singing French soldier, in Devil-May-Care (1929). He starred with Dorothy Janis in The Pagan (1929), with Greta Garbo in Mata Hari (1931), with Myrna Loy in The Barbarian (1933) and opposite Lupe Vélez in Laughing Boy (1934).

When his contract with MGM Studios expired in 1935 and the studio did not renew it, Novarro continued to act sporadically, appearing in films for Republic Pictures, a Mexican religious drama, and a French comedy. In the 1940s, he had several small roles in American films, including We Were Strangers (1949), directed by John Huston and starring Jennifer Jones and John Garfield. In 1958, he was considered for a role in the television series The Green Peacock, with Howard Duff and Ida Lupino, after their CBS Television sitcom Mr. Adams and Eve (1957–58). The project, however, never materialized. A Broadway tryout was aborted in the 1960s. Novarro kept busy on television, appearing in NBC's The High Chaparral as late as 1968.

At the peak of his success in the late 1920s and early 1930s, Novarro was earning more than US$100,000 per film. He invested some of his income in real estate, and his Hollywood Hills residence is one of the more renowned designs (1927) by Lloyd Wright, the son of Frank Lloyd Wright. When his career ended, he was still able to maintain a comfortable lifestyle.

Personal life 

Novarro was troubled all his life by his conflicted feelings toward his Roman Catholic religion and his homosexuality. His life-long struggle with alcoholism is often traced to these problems. In the early 1920s Novarro had a romantic relationship with composer Harry Partch, who was working as an usher at the Los Angeles Philharmonic at the time, but Novarro broke off the affair as he achieved greater success as an actor. He was romantically involved with Hollywood journalist Herbert Howe, who was also his publicist in the late 1920s, and with a wealthy man from San Francisco, Noël Sullivan.

Along with Dolores del Río, Lupe Vélez and James Cagney, Novarro was accused of promoting communism in California after they attended a special screening of the film ¡Que viva México! by Russian filmmaker Sergei Eisenstein.

Murder 
Novarro was murdered on October 30, 1968, by brothers Paul and Tom Ferguson, aged 22 and 17, who called him and offered their sexual services. He had in the past hired prostitutes from an agency to come to his Laurel Canyon home for sex, and the Fergusons obtained Novarro's telephone number from a previous guest.

According to the prosecution in the murder case, the two young men believed that a large sum of money was hidden in Novarro's house. The prosecution accused the brothers of torturing Novarro for several hours to force him to reveal where the (non-existent) money was hidden. They left the house with $20 they took from his bathrobe pocket. Novarro died as a result of asphyxiation, having choked to death on his own blood after being beaten. The two perpetrators were caught and sentenced to long prison terms, but released on parole in the mid-1970s. Both were later re-arrested for unrelated crimes for which they served longer prison terms than for the murder of Novarro. In a 1998 interview, Paul Ferguson finally assumed the blame for Novarro's death. Tom Ferguson died of suicide on March 6, 2005. Paul Ferguson died in 2018, while serving out a 60-year sentence for rape in Missouri.

Novarro is buried in Calvary Cemetery, East Los Angeles, California.

Novarro's star on the Hollywood Walk of Fame is at 6350 Hollywood Boulevard.

In popular culture 

Novarro's murder served as the basis for the short story by Charles Bukowski titled "The Murder of Ramon Vasquez", as well as for the song "Tango," by Jerry Leiber and Mike Stoller, recorded by Peggy Lee on her Mirrors album.
Novarro's murder is among the many epochal events recalled in Joan Didion's meditative 'California zeitgeist' essay The White Album.
Greek playwright Pavlos Matesis wrote a play in two parts titled The Ghost of Mr. Ramon Novarro, which was first staged at the National Theatre of Greece in 1973.
Novarro's murder is briefly referenced in the sixth season The Sopranos episode "Cold Stones", following the violent murder of a closeted homosexual character.
In late 2005, the Wings Theatre in New York City staged the world premiere of Through a Naked Lens by George Barthel. The play combined fact and fiction to depict Novarro's rise to fame and his relationship with Hollywood journalist Herbert Howe.
Novarro's relationship with Howe is discussed in two biographies: Allan R. Ellenberger's Ramón Novarro and André Soares's Beyond Paradise: The Life of Ramón Novarro.
In 2015, the murder of Ramon Novarro was covered in the television series Aquarius in the episode "Cease to Resist".

Filmography

References

Bibliography

External links 

 
 
 
 Ramón Novarro Photo Gallery
 Photographs of Ramon Novarro
 

1899 births
1968 deaths
1968 murders in the United States
20th-century American male actors
20th-century Mexican male actors
20th-century Mexican screenwriters
20th-century Mexican male writers
American male film actors
American male silent film actors
American male television actors
Burials at Calvary Cemetery (Los Angeles)
Deaths by beating in the United States
Deaths from choking
American gay actors
Hispanic and Latino American male actors
LGBT Hispanic and Latino American people
LGBT Roman Catholics
Mexican gay actors
Male actors from Durango
Metro-Goldwyn-Mayer contract players
Mexican Roman Catholics
Mexican emigrants to the United States
Mexican film directors
Mexican film producers
Mexican male film actors
Mexican male silent film actors
Mexican male stage actors
Mexican male television actors
Mexican people of Spanish descent
Murdered Mexican Americans
People from Durango City
People murdered in Los Angeles
20th-century LGBT people